Homozeugos is a genus of African plants in the grass family.

 Species
 Homozeugos conciliatum Guala - Angola
 Homozeugos eylesii C.E.Hubb. - Tanzania, Zambia, Malawi
 Homozeugos fragile Stapf - Angola
 Homozeugos gossweileri Stapf - Angola
 Homozeugos huillense (Rendle) Stapf - Angola
 Homozeugos katakton Clayton - Angola, Zambia

References

Andropogoneae
Grasses of Africa
Poaceae genera